Novialoidea (meaning "new wings") is an extinct clade of macronychopteran pterosaurs that lived from the latest Early Jurassic to the latest Late Cretaceous (early Toarcian to late Maastrichtian age), their fossils having been found on all continents except Antarctica.

History and classification
Novialoidea was named by paleontologist Alexander Wilhelm Armin Kellner in 2003 as a node-based taxon consisting of the last common ancestor of Campylognathoides, Quetzalcoatlus and all its descendants. This name was derived from Latin novus "new", and ala, "wing", in reference to the wing synapomorphies that the members of the clade possess.

Paleontologist David Unwin in 2003 had named the group Lonchognatha in the same issue of the journal that published Novialoidea (Geological Society of London, Special Publications 217) and defined it as Eudimorphodon ranzii, Rhamphorhynchus muensteri, their most recent common ancestor and all its descendants (as a node-based taxon). Under Unwin's and Kellner's phylogenetic analyses (where Eudimorphodon and Campylognathoides form a family that is basal to both Rhamphorhynchus and Quetzalcoatlus), and because Novialoidea was named first (in pages 105–137, while Lonchognatha was named in pages 139-190), Lonchognatha is an objective junior synonym of the former. However, other analyses find Lonchognatha to be valid (Andres et al., 2010), or synonymous with the Pterosauria (Andres, 2010).

Below is a cladogram showing the phylogenetic analysis conducted by Brian Andres and colleagues in 2014. Based on the analysis, Novialoidea contains the genus Campylognathoides as well as the group Breviquartossa.

References

Fossil taxa described in 2003
 
Toarcian first appearances
Maastrichtian extinctions
Taxa named by Alexander Kellner